Morrison House may refer to:

in the United States
(by state, then city/town)

 James Arthur Morrison House, Mobile, Alabama, listed on the National Register of Historic Places (NRHP) 
 Morrison House (Prescott, Arizona), listed on the NRHP in Prescott, Arizona
 Jackson Morrison House, Hartwell, Georgia, listed on the NRHP in Hart County, Georgia
 Francis H. Morrison House, LaPorte, Indiana, NRHP-listed
 Morrison House (Kirksville, Kentucky), listed on the NRHP in Madison County, Kentucky
 Alfred W. Morrison House, Fayette, Missouri, NRHP-listed
 Roderick M. Morrison House, Penn Yan, New York, NRHP-listed
 Morrison House (Cincinnati, Ohio), NRHP-listed
 Edward Morrison House, Pukwana, South Dakota, NRHP-listed
 William J. Morrison Jr. House, San Antonio, Texas, listed on the NRHP in Bexar County, Texas
 Morrison House (Harrisonburg, Virginia), NRHP-listed